The Association of Social Educators (SL) is a trade union representing social workers and carers in Denmark.

The union was founded by 1979, and was initially affiliated to the Confederation of Professionals in Denmark (FTF).  In 1986. it left FTF, and instead affiliated with the Danish Confederation of Trade Unions (LO).  The LO and FTF merged in 2019, and the union became a member of their successor, the Danish Trade Union Confederation (FH).

As of 2018, the union had 35,648 members.

External links

References

Danish social workers
Trade unions in Denmark
Social work organizations